José Juan Piñero González (August 29, 1942 - March 14, 2018), better known as Pijuán, was a Puerto Rican musician who produced and/or has been credited on several albums under the record labels Phillips Borinquen, Hit Parade, Kubaney, Discos Melón, TH Records, Private Ranch Records and Musigol Records.

Early life and career
Pijuán's love for music began during childhood, entertaining the crowds with a small band while attending Escuela Superior República de Colombia in San Juan, Puerto Rico. After completing studies at the University of Puerto Rico, Pijuán combined tropical rhythms creating his own musical identity called "salsa lounge", throughout festivals playing salsa, son, guaguanco, guaracha, bomba, plena, ballad, mambo, jala jala, calypso, and bugalú.

During his career, he met instrumental individuals such as the director of the orchestra Rafael Muñoz, expanding the opportunity to play in prestigious hotels around Puerto Rico. Another key individual and composer was Paquito López Vidal, with whom Pijuán worked together at the Fiesta Room in the Hotel Condado Beach.

In 1964, Pijuán put together a sextet of musicians to work at the Barraca, has worked in several countries throughout the world, such as Aruba, Curazao, Colombia, Venezuela, Panamá, Perú, and the United States (Washington and New York City), thus establishing the sextet at the very same Hotel Condado Beach the following year.

TV Shows

During the next decades, Pijuán showcased his vibrant Sextet to Puerto Rican TV viewers, and/or invited local musicians to shows like Show Coca-Cola, Sábado a las 12 con Pijuán and Fiestas Fijas con Pijuán - Telemundo Canal 2 (1967-1972); produced and directed La Factoría de la Salsa - TeleSiete (1973-1974); El Show del Mediodía - Channel 4 - WAPA-TV (1974-1976); and again, followed same format for the ‘new’ show Pijuán produced/directed La Nueva Factoría de la Salsa - TeleSiete (1980-1981); Encantados con Maggie (1983-1986) was part of the segment called El show de las 12 produced by Paquito Cordero and hosted by Eddie Miro - Telemundo / Canal 2 (until 1Q-2005); and Con La Música X Dentro - CLMXD on WPRV TV / Canal 13 – o Tele-Oro, broadcast directly from Pijuán's home, along with telecancionero—a karaoke format show (3Q2005-2009).

News
Pijuán recorded with Baby Boomer Boys, a group consisting of Edward Delgado, Harry Fraticelli, Esteban Rivera, Sammy Aguirre and Tony Guayama.

Pijuán worked both media circuits, TV and music, for several years, providing a stepping stone for others to follow.  Pijuán met famous acclaimed musicians and actors like Rocio Durcal, and Liza Minnelli to mention a couple.

In 2016, Pijuán celebrated his fifty-year career as a professional musician by playing at several venues around Puerto Rico.

Pijuan died on Tuesday March 14, 2018 at age 76 due to cardiac complications at Auxilio Mutuo Hospital, in Hato Rey, Puerto Rico.

Discography
LPs compiled compliments of Herencia Latina:

 2010 - Pijuán y Los Baby Boomer Boys – Bohemia Bailable – Musigol Records
 1986 - Bizcocho & Pijuán – El premio 'Gordo' del Sabor – Private Ranch Records
 1983 - Grandes Hits Navideños de Pijuán – Private Ranch Records
 1982 - Harry Fraticelli – El Cantante del Pueblo (produced by Pijuán) – Private Ranch Records
 1982 - Orlando Pabellón – Ahora Sí Que Estamos...Heavy (produced by Pijuán) – Private Ranch Records
 1982 - Pijuán – Temas de Amor – Introducing Sammy Aguirre – Private Ranch Records
 1981 - Pijuán – La Supertrulla [La Súper Trulla] # No. 3 – Discos Melón | TH Records
 1980 - Pijuán – La Supertrulla [La Súper Trulla] # No. 2 – Discos Melón | TH Records
 1979 - Pijuán – Emociones - vocals Hanibal – Discos Melón | TH Records

 1978 - Pijuán – Salsa de Salón – Discos Melón
 1978 - Puerto Rican Power – La Pura Naturaleza de la Salsa (produced by Pijuán) – Discos Melón
 1977 - Pijuán – Merengues a Lo Pijuán – Discos Melón
 1975 - Pijuán – La Supertrulla [La Súper Trulla] – Discos Melón All-Stars – Discos Melón
 1974 - Pijuán – La Factoria de la Salsa - vocals Tony Guayama – Discos Melón
 1973 - Pijuán – Un Chorrito de Pitorro – Discos Melón
 1972 - Pijuán y su Sexteto – El Nuevo Album de Pijuán... – Discos Melón
 1972 - Pijuán y su Sexteto – Mas Producción en Salsa Melódica – Discos REX SA (Discos Melón)
 1971 - Pijuán y su Sexteto – Arráncame la Vida – Kubaney

 1970 - Pijuán y su Sexteto – Ahora Es Cuando...É – Kubaney
 1970 - Pijuán y su Sexteto – Ahora Sí – Kubaney
 1970 - Pijuán (45rpm) – La Maestranza (A) - La Piragua (B) – Kubaney K-5362 (two cuts from the 'Ahora Sí')
 1969 - Pijuán y su Sexteto – Sabor a Pueblo – A Soul Full Latin Sound for 69 – Hit Parade
 1968 - Pijuán y su Sexteto – Estamos en Todas – Groovy – Hit Parade
 1967 - Pijuán y su Sexteto – Swing-A-Ling y Boogaloo – Phillips Borinquen
 1966 - Pijuán y su Sexteto – En el Tradewinds ‘El Floron’ | Swing with the Tide at the Tradewinds – Phillips Borinquen

See also

 List of Puerto Ricans
 Afro-Latin American
 El Gran Combo de Puerto Rico, a musical institution that has been around for 5 decades.
 Mongo Santamaria
 Charlie Palmieri
 Oscar D'Leon's musical career began with La Dimensión Latina in the early 1970s.
 Tata Guines
 Alfredo "Chocolate" Armenteros
 Ray Barretto
 Machito
 Celia Cruz's career did begin with La Sonora Matancera in the early 1950s.
 Salsa music
 Music of Puerto Rico
 Andy Montanez
 Xavier Serbia
 Eddie Santiago

References

Further reading
Coordina Carlos Velásquez El Rincón de los Coleccionistas Exquisitos

1942 births
2018 deaths
Salsa musicians
Puerto Rican businesspeople
People from Trujillo Alto, Puerto Rico
Latin pop singers
20th-century Puerto Rican male singers
Puerto Rican people of Spanish descent
Puerto Rican male composers